William Browning may refer to:
 William A. Browning, private secretary of President Andrew Johnson
 William J. Browning (1850–1920), American politician
 William Browning (pianist) (1924–1997), American pianist
 William Docker Browning (1931–2008), U.S. federal judge
 William Browning (cricketer) ( 1795), English cricketer
 William Browning (footballer) (fl. 1933–1941), Scottish footballer
 Bill Browning (1931–1977), American bluegrass musician

See also
 William Browning Spencer (born 1946), American writer